Huang Nanyan (born April 11, 1977 in Guangxi) is a badminton player from the People's Republic of China.

Career
A women's doubles specialist, Huang won a number of top tier titles in the late 1990s and early 2000s. The first of these came at the 1997 Asian Badminton Championships (now Badminton Asia Championships) with Liu Zhong. The rest came in partnership with Yang Wei and included the World Badminton Grand Prix (2000), and the Dutch (1998), Brunei (1998), South Korea (1999, 2001), Singapore (1999, 2002), and Malaysia (2000, 2001, 2002) Opens. Huang and Yang were silver medalists at the 2000 Olympic Games in Sydney, losing the final to their formidable fellow countrywomen Ge Fei and Gu Jun. Huang and Yang competed together in the 2002 Uber Cup series (women's world team championships) and clinched the deciding point for their country in the final "tie" against South Korea. Huang apparently retired after this victory while Yang went on to further success in partnership with Zhang Jiewen.

References

Badminton players at the 2000 Summer Olympics
Olympic badminton players of China
Olympic silver medalists for China
People from Liuzhou
1977 births
Living people
Badminton players from Guangxi
Olympic medalists in badminton
Asian Games medalists in badminton
Badminton players at the 2002 Asian Games
Chinese female badminton players
Medalists at the 2000 Summer Olympics
Asian Games gold medalists for China
Asian Games bronze medalists for China
Medalists at the 2002 Asian Games
20th-century Chinese women